Mimogyaritus fasciatus is a species of beetle in the family Cerambycidae, and the only species in the genus Mimogyaritus. It was described by Fisher in 1925.

References

Desmiphorini
Beetles described in 1925
Monotypic beetle genera